Upendra Tiwari is an Indian politician and Minister of State (Independent Charge), of the Bharatiya Janata Party. Tiwari is a member of the Uttar Pradesh Legislative Assembly from the Phephana Vidhan Sabha constituency in Ballia district. He defeated a big leader of UP Ambika Chaudhari BSP (Ex-SP Leader). He was a student at the University of Allahabad.

Early life and education
Tiwari was born 10 January 1973 in Ballia, Uttar Pradesh to his father Vishwanath Tiwari. In 2004, he married Dipika Tiwari, they have two daughters. He got Master of Arts (Hindi) degree in 1999 and  Bachelor of Laws degree in 1996 from Allahabad University. In 2002 he got Master of Arts in Ancient History degree from Chattarpati Sahu Ji Maharaj College Kanpur.

Political career
He has been an MLA since 2012, from Phephana constituency in Ballia district of Uttar Pradesh. In the first term 2012 Uttar Pradesh Legislative Assembly election he defeated Samajwadi Party candidate Ambika Chaudhary by a margin of 7,387 votes.

In second term 2017 Uttar Pradesh Legislative Assembly election he again defeated Bahujan Samaj Party candidate Ambika Choudhary by a margin of 17,897 votes.

In March 2017, he got State Ministry (Independent charge) of Water compensation, Land Development, Water Resources, Barren Land Development, Forest and Environment, Uddyan, Cooperatives in Yogi Adityanath ministry.

Controversy 

On 21 October 2021, Tiwari said that "95% Indians Don't Need Petrol" while trying to justify fuel price hike during a press conference.

Posts held

References 

People from Ballia district
Bharatiya Janata Party politicians from Uttar Pradesh
Uttar Pradesh MLAs 2017–2022
Living people
Yogi ministry
1973 births